William Greening was a member of the Wisconsin State Assembly.

Biography
Greening was born in December 1827 in what was then Devonshire, England. He settled in La Grange, Walworth County, Wisconsin in 1855.

Career
Greening was a member of the Assembly during the 1877 session. Other positions he held include Chairman (similar to Mayor), Supervisor and Assessor of La Grange. He was a Republican.

References

People from Devon
British emigrants to the United States
People from La Grange, Wisconsin
Republican Party members of the Wisconsin State Assembly
Mayors of places in Wisconsin
1827 births
Year of death missing